Niklas Hollsten (born 15 November 1983 in Kimito) is a Finnish freeride snowboarder.

Career
He has represented Finland in freeride already for several years. In 2010 Scandinavian freeride championships he won the gold medal. Furthermore he in overall 2010 freeride world qualifier ranking he received the third place. He is also the first ever Finnish male who participated Freeride World Tour. Though Hollsten has a freestyle and boardercross background right now he competes only in freeride.

References

External links
 Hollsten's official home page
 Hollsten's profile in international freeride pages

Finnish male snowboarders
1983 births
Living people
Sportspeople from Southwest Finland